Timothy A. Keck (born 1967) is an American newspaper publisher.

Early life and education
Keck was born in Indiana to Edward and Janet Keck, both of whom were newspaper reporters. The family moved to Wisconsin while he was a child and Keck eventually attended the University of Wisconsin–Madison.

Career
In 1988, as a third-year student at the University of Wisconsin–Madison, Keck co-founded The Onion with Christopher Johnson before selling the satirical newspaper to Scott Dikkers and Peter Haise for $19,000 the following year. Keck used the proceeds to repay a loan, then spent the next six months holidaying in Brazil, before returning to the United States where he settled in Seattle with the intent of founding a free, weekly alternative newspaper. The resulting publication, The Stranger, began publishing in September 1991. In the early 2000s he sold a minority of the paper to the Chicago Reader and founded the Portland Mercury, operating the two papers as Index Newspapers, LLC. 

In 2018, Keck stepped down as publisher of The Stranger, while continuing as president of Index Newspapers.

Political views
As of 2011, according to The Seattle Times, Keck was "largely unknown in Seattle". However, during the 2009 mayoral campaign of Mike McGinn, Keck directed The Stranger to "turn up the dial as high as we could" becoming, according to The Seattle Times, "a de facto arm of the McGinn campaign". The newspaper's endorsement was given to McGinn in a 6,000-word front-page treatment, while news coverage of McGinn's opponent Joe Mallahan used profanities to describe him. Keck, who has rarely given political donations, provided monetary support to the McGinn campaign and attended McGinn's election night victory party. Keck also donated $250 in 2004 to the presidential campaign of John Kerry and $250 the following year to the senatorial campaign of Maria Cantwell.

Personal life
According to Keck, he suffers from dyslexia, somnambulism, and is a recreational user of marijuana. 

Keck has two children with a woman described in different sources as either a spouse or girlfriend.

References

External links
 

1967 births
Living people
American newspaper publishers (people)
University of Wisconsin–Madison alumni